Ilathur, also spelled Elathur, is a Taluk at Tenkasi district in the state of Tamil Nadu, India.  It is close to the town of Tenkasi and also 10 km from the Courtallam waterfalls. It has the Beautiful Shiva temple Madunathaswami Temple located on the banks of the big lake Kullam. The famous Lord Muruga temple (Thirumalai kovil) is near to Ilathur. It is also near the town of Shencottah.

Demographics
 India census, The population of Ilathur is approximately 9875. Males constitute 50% of the population and females 50%. Ilathur has an average literacy rate of 46%, lower than the national average of 59.5%: male literacy is 58%, and female literacy is 35%. In Ilathur, 9% of the population is under 6 years of age.

References

Cities and towns in Tirunelveli district

bpy:এলাথুর
new:इलाथुर
ta:இலத்தூர்